Haris Mehmedagić (born 29 March 1988) is a Bosnian professional footballer of Croatian heritage who plays as a centre-back for Austrian club FC Nenzing.

Honours
Sloboda Tuzla 
Bosnian Premier League runner up: 2015–16
Bosnian Cup runner up: 2015–16

References

External links
Austrian career stats - ÖFB
Haris Mehmedagić at Sofascore

1988 births
Living people
Footballers from Zagreb
Bosniaks of Croatia
Association football central defenders
Croatian footballers
Croatia youth international footballers
Bosnia and Herzegovina footballers
Bosnia and Herzegovina under-21 international footballers
NK Zagreb players
NK Lučko players
Vasas SC players
NK Novigrad players
FK Sloboda Tuzla players
FK Zvijezda 09 players
ATSV Stadl-Paura players
DSV Leoben players
Croatian Football League players 
First Football League (Croatia) players 
Nemzeti Bajnokság I players
Premier League of Bosnia and Herzegovina players
Austrian Regionalliga players
Austrian Landesliga players
Bosnia and Herzegovina expatriate footballers
Expatriate footballers in Croatia
Expatriate footballers in Hungary
Expatriate footballers in Austria
Bosnia and Herzegovina expatriate sportspeople in Croatia
Bosnia and Herzegovina expatriate sportspeople in Hungary
Bosnia and Herzegovina expatriate sportspeople in Austria